Christophe Delmotte (born 9 June 1969) is a Franco-Belgian former professional footballer. He is an assistant coach with FC Metz.

Honours
 UEFA Intertoto Cup: 1997
 Coupe de la Ligue: 2000-01
 Ligue 1: 2001–02, 2002–03

References

 
 

1969 births
Living people
People from Comines-Warneton
Association football defenders
French people of Belgian descent
French footballers
RC Lens players
Ligue 1 players
CS Sedan Ardennes players
Ligue 2 players
AS Cannes players
Olympique Lyonnais players
Stade de Reims players
AS Saint-Priest players